Cleveland Central Catholic High School is a private co-educational high school located in Cleveland, Ohio.  It is run by the Roman Catholic Diocese of Cleveland. It is a member of the North Central Association, the Notre Dame Education Association, and the National Catholic Education Association.

History

Cleveland Central Catholic was formed by the merger of 4 Roman Catholic Cleveland high schools - St. John Cantius, Lourdes Central, St. Michael the Archangel, and St. Stanislaus. Its first year of operation was the 1969-1970 scholastic year.

Clubs and activities
Student clubs include: Academic Challenge Team, Chess Club, Class Councils, Spanish Club, National Honor Society, Liturgical Music, SADD, Drama Club, and Intramural Sports.
 
The school's Latin Club functions as a local chapter of both the Ohio Junior Classical League (OJCL) and National Junior Classical League (NJCL).

Ohio High School Athletic Association State Championships
 Girls basketball – 2007
 Boys basketball – 2009

Notable alumni
Vanessa Bell Calloway – Actress
Earl Boykins – NBA player, 1999-2012
Delbert Cowsette – NFL player for the Chicago Bears
Jantel Lavender – WNBA player for the Los Angeles Sparks
Jayson Wells (born 1976) - basketball player
Bill Wertz – former Major League Baseball player
Eric Wilkerson – football player

Notes and references

External links
Cleveland Central Catholic High School

High schools in Cuyahoga County, Ohio
National Register of Historic Places in Cleveland, Ohio
Education in Cleveland
Catholic secondary schools in Ohio
Educational institutions established in 1969
Slavic Village
1969 establishments in Ohio
Roman Catholic Diocese of Cleveland